Luisi is an Italian surname. Notable people with the surname include:

Antonio Luisi (born 1994), Luxembourgian footballer
Carlo Luisi (born 1977), Italian footballer
Clotilde Luisi (1882–1969), Uruguayan lawyer
Fabio Luisi (born 1959), Italian conductor
Gianluca Luisi (born 1970), Italian classical pianist
Hector Luisi (1919–2013), Uruguayan politician
James Luisi (1928–2002), American basketball player and actor
Paulina Luisi (1875–1945), Uruguayan feminist
Pier Luigi Luisi (born 1938), Italian chemist
Zebastian Lucky Luisi (born 1984), New Zealand rugby league player

Italian-language surnames
Patronymic surnames
Surnames from given names